Darshana Rajendran is an Indian actress who works predominantly in the Malayalam and Tamil film industries. Darshana debuted her acting career in the 2014 Malayalam film John Paul Vaathil Thurakkunnu. She then acted in Mayanadhi directed by Aashiq Abu.Her other films include Virus (2019), directed by Aashiq Abu, Vijay Superum Pournamiyum,  (2019)  directed by Jis Joy, Koode directed by Anjali Menon, Hridayam (2022)
directed by Vineeth Sreenivasan and Thuramukham directed by Rajeev Ravi. Darshana also bagged character roles in Tamil films like Kavan (2017) and Irumbu Thirai (2018).. In 2022 she acted the title role in the movie Jaya Jaya Jaya Jaya Hey.

Filmography

All films are in Malayalam language unless otherwise noted.

As playback singer

Webseries

References
 Karan Johar bags remake rights of Pranav, Kalyani’s Hridayam  
 Home » Entertainment » Malayalam Cinema » Darshana Rajendran On Success..
 Title poster of Nivin Pauly’s production venture Dear Students is out 
 Hridayam review: Darshana Rajendran steals the show in this film which boasts of nostalgic storytelling, heartfelt performances, eye-catching frames, and soothing music

External links 

Actresses in Malayalam cinema
1988 births
Living people
Indian film actresses
Actresses from Kochi
21st-century Indian actresses
Actresses in Tamil cinema
Lady Shri Ram College alumni